Peckerwood Point is an unincorporated community in Tipton County, Tennessee, United States.

References

Unincorporated communities in Tipton County, Tennessee
Unincorporated communities in Tennessee